The South Western Command of the Indian Army was established on 15 April 2005 and became fully operational on 15 August 2005. It was in response to the emerging threats and opportunities on the Western Indo-Pak border. It is headquartered at Jaipur, Rajasthan.

The command's operational units include I Corps, formerly under Central Command,  X Corps, likewise transferred from Western Command and an Artillery Division.

Structure 
Currently, the Western Command has been assigned operational units under:- I Corps,  X Corps and 42nd Artillery Division. The command in total has following units under its belt :- 3 infantry divisions (1 for Mountain warfare), 1 armoured division, 1 artillery division, 2 Reorganised Army Plains Infantry Division (RAPID), 1 armoured brigade, 1 Air-defence brigade, and 1 engineering brigade.

In 2021, the except the 33 Armoured Division all the units of I Corps was transferred to Northern Command to focus on the Sino-Indian border at Ladakh.

List of Commanders

Notes

References 
Richard A. Renaldi and Ravi Rikhe, 'Indian Army Order of Battle,' Orbat.com for Tiger Lily Books: A division of General Data LLC, 2011.

Commands of the Indian Army
Military units and formations established in 2005
2005 establishments in Rajasthan